Asamushi Dam is a gravity dam located in Aomori Prefecture in Japan. The dam is used for flood control. The catchment area of the dam is 5 km2. The dam impounds about 4  ha of land when full and can store 300 thousand cubic meters of water. The construction of the dam was started on 1981 and completed in 2002.

References

Dams in Aomori Prefecture
2002 establishments in Japan